Daba Miao Ethnic Township is an ethnic township for Miao people, which is under the administration of Xingwen County, Sichuan, China. , it administers Yanzhou Residential Community and the following 11 villages:
Pingzhai Village
Xiaozhai Village
Longtang Village
Hongqi Village
Chaoyang Village
Jianguo Village
Bai'aolin Village
Bamaowan Village
Gufotai Village
Silong Village
Shaba Village

See also 
 List of township-level divisions of Sichuan

References 

Township-level divisions of Sichuan
Xingwen County
Miao ethnic townships